Loraine Victor is a South African international lawn bowler.

Bowls career
In 1998 Victor was part of the fours team that won gold at the 1998 Commonwealth Games in Kuala Lumpur.

She also won a gold medal in the Women's Triples at the 2004 World Outdoor Bowls Championship in Ayr and four years later repeated the achievement by winning another gold medal in the Women's Triples at the 2008 World Outdoor Bowls Championship in Christchurch.

In 2007 she won the fours silver medal at the Atlantic Bowls Championships.

She won the 2017 singles and two fours titles at the National Championships bowling for the Wingate Park Bowls Club.

References

Living people
South African female bowls players
Bowls World Champions
1948 births
Commonwealth Games medallists in lawn bowls
Commonwealth Games gold medallists for South Africa
Bowls players at the 1998 Commonwealth Games
Medallists at the 1998 Commonwealth Games